The Czech Squash Association is the national organisation for squash in the Czech Republic.

External links
 Official site

See also
 Czech Republic men's national squash team

National members of the World Squash Federation
Squash in the Czech Republic
Squash